William Elkins or Elkin may refer to:

 William Henry Pferinger Elkins (1883–1964), Canadian soldier
 William Lukens Elkins (1832–1903), American businessman
 William McIntire Elkins (1882–1947), American collector of rare books and Dickensiana
 William Lewis Elkin (1855–1933), American astronomer